Alias Boston Blackie (1942) is the third in a series of fourteen Columbia Pictures "B" movies starring Chester Morris as Boston Blackie. It was preceded by Meet Boston Blackie, Confessions of Boston Blackie and followed by Boston Blackie Goes Hollywood. Once again, Blackie is suspected of committing a crime, in this instance of helping a prisoner escape.

Plot
In the Christmas spirit, Boston Blackie (Chester Morris) decides to entertain the inmates at his old "alma mater" by bringing a variety show headed by clown Roggi McKay (George McKay). Roggi drops one of his showgirls, Eve Sanders (Adele Mara), as she has already visited her prisoner brother, Joe Trilby (Larry Parks), the maximum allowed number of times that month. However, Blackie kindheartedly lets her tag along.

Inspector Farraday (Richard Lane) and Detective Joe Mathews (Walter Sande) unexpectedly join the group on the bus, just to keep an eye on Blackie. When Joe manages to escape from the prison, by tying Roggi up and putting on his costume and makeup, Farraday suspects Blackie helped him.

Blackie heads to Eve's apartment. Sure enough, Joe shows up soon afterward. Joe claims he is innocent and that Duke Banton and someone named Steve got him to drive them to the crime scene without telling him why. When the robbery was foiled, they fled, leaving him behind. Now he wants to kill the pair, regardless of the consequences. Joe takes Blackie's suit and ties him up. Eve eventually arrives and frees him.

Blackie and his sidekick "the Runt" (George E. Stone) head to Duke Banton's place, but arrive too late and find only a dead body. Then Joe enters. He claims he did not kill Banton. When the police surround the building, Blackie has Joe switch places with Banton after Farraday has examined the corpse. The "body" is taken away in an ambulance. Blackie is taken into custody, but manages to victimize Detective Mathews, putting on his uniform to get away.

From information provided by Jumbo Madigan (Cy Kendall), Blackie figures out that the other robber was taxi driver Steve Caveroni (Paul Fix). He has Eve pose as a fare to lure Caveroni to Banton's hotel room. Caveroni feels he is in control of the situation as he has a gun, so Blackie has little trouble getting him to confess he killed his partner (Banton was trying to flee, leaving Caveroni to take the blame) and that Joe is innocent. Farraday and his policemen eavesdrop through the door. Once he realizes he is trapped, Caveroni makes a break for it, but is shot dead.

Cast

Lloyd Bridges plays the uncredited bus driver.

References

External links
 
 
 
 

1942 films
1940s Christmas films
1940s crime films
American black-and-white films
Columbia Pictures films
American Christmas films
Films directed by Lew Landers
American crime films
Boston Blackie films
1940s American films